"Thong Song" is a song recorded by American R&B singer Sisqó. It was released on February 15, 2000, as the second single from his solo debut studio album, Unleash the Dragon (1999). "Thong Song" garnered four Grammy nominations and numerous other awards. The song peaked at number one on the Billboard Rhythmic top 40 chart and number three on the Billboard Hot 100, Sisqó's second highest-peaking hit behind "Incomplete". It was a major success worldwide as well, reaching the top ten throughout European charts and reaching number three in the United Kingdom, Netherlands, and Denmark. The song also topped the charts in New Zealand.

Production 
The song was written and produced by Sisqó, and Tim & Bob, the duo of Tim Kelley and Bob Robinson. Songwriters Desmond Child and Draco Rosa receive songwriting credit because of the interpolation of part of their composition, "Livin' la Vida Loca" (originally recorded by Ricky Martin), in the song's lyrics. The obbligato strings that are heard throughout the song, performed for the record by violinist Bruce Dukov, are inspired by Wes Montgomery's cover of  The Beatles' "Eleanor Rigby" which Tim originally sampled in its origin.

The impetus for the song came from when the then 19-year-old singer Sisqó joked that his hair turned white the first time he saw a thong, similar to Charlton Heston in the film The Ten Commandments.

Rapper Lil' Kim was originally supposed to be included on the album version but declined. However, Kim and Sisqó collaborated on her second album The Notorious K.I.M. a year later.

The alternate version, the official remix to the original version, "Thong Song Uncensored", features a guest rap from Foxy Brown in the spot where Sisqó whispers the main verse for the third time, and is included on the soundtrack for Nutty Professor II: The Klumps. A second, more urban-themed video was shot for the remix by Little X.

Track listing

Credits and personnel 
Credits adapted from the liner notes of Unleash the Dragon.

Recording locations
Larrabee West, LA
The Tracken Place, LA, CA

Personnel
Mixed By – Manny Marroquin
Producer – Sisqo The Golden Child for Da Ish Entertainment, Tim Kelley and Bob Robinson
Recorded By – Jan Fairchild
Written By – Mark Andrews, Tim Kelley, Bob Robinson, Robi Rosa, and Desmond Child

Music video

MTV version 
The video was released in 2000 and directed by Joseph Kahn. Set in Miami, Sisqó is on the phone with one of his friends. His daughter and his wife return from shopping, and his daughter finds and shows him the thong. Sisqó is frightened and looks at his wife in a confused matter, and his wife shrugs her shoulders. It then switches to Sisqó going to the beach from his home to participate in a Spring Break party with a large number of young women who are generally wearing bikinis and thongs, with the exception of one woman who wears a G-string. There are also scenes with Sisqo and his backup dancers driving a Bentley Azure down the Florida Keys, and cameos from the other three members of Sisqó's group, Dru Hill, Method Man & Redman, Caddillac Tah, Ja Rule, as well as LL Cool J. Sisqó performs acrobatic feats atop the crowd that contradict the laws of physics, culminating in a stage performance lit with blacklights and with an orchestra in the background.

The whole video, consisting of cuts between Sisqó and barely clad women, drew criticism as it was accused of exploiting women as sex objects, and was credited for starting a new wave of "booty" videos. The director of the video, Joseph Kahn, was quoted as saying, "I listen to 'Thong Song', and I say, 'Well, this song is about asses.' So you can either accept it and do something like I did, or you can go and try and turn the 'Thong Song' into some kind of Chemical Brothers video and make it all pretentious; about some fucking communist upheaval or something. Let's just relax and make a booty video, and let's make a really good one, and make it fun."

Sisqo stated the video was carefully shot not to reveal too many buttocks in thong swimsuits but allowed with unorthodox camera angles.

Alternative version with Foxy Brown 
In the alternative version of the video, after giving a radio interview with Nokio and Jazz of Dru Hill in his hometown of Baltimore, Sisqó escapes from a group of fans with the help of Foxy Brown to a fashion show. Here, models strut in sexy costumes, which (again) all consist of bikinis just as in the original video, this time with the exception of two women in thongs. The video also features a cameo by professional wrestler Big Show. The song was done for the soundtrack of Nutty Professor II: The Klumps. The video was directed by Little X.

2017 remake 
In 2017, Sisqó remade the song and music video with JCY, which was released on July 18, 2017. The video can be seen on YouTube and WorldStarHipHop with the video in its first week hitting over one million views.

Charts

Weekly charts

Year-end charts

Certifications

Other versions and sampling
In 2000, Chicago female rapper Strings released a single entitled "Tongue Song", which was a female response to "Thong Song". It peaked at number 24 on the Billboard Bubbling Under R&B/Hip-Hop Singles chart and number 13 on Billboard Hot Rap Singles chart.

Reggaeton artists Daddy Yankee and Nicky Jam sampled "Thong Song" for their 2001 song "Tu Cuerpo En La Cama" on Yankee's album El Cartel II.

British girl group Little Mix interpolated various elements of the song for their song "Love a Girl Right" from their album LM5.

The Mad TV season 6 premiere featured a "Wrong Song" music video parody in which Aries Spears as Sisqo ridicules obese women for wearing thongs and bikinis.

In 2016, Australian pop singer and songwriter Sia released This Is Acting, featuring the track "Sweet Design," which samples and references the "Thong Song."

In 2017, American rapper Ludacris released a duet song "Vitamin D" featuring American singer Ty Dolla Sign. This song featured samples and rhythm of the "Thong Song".

On the February 11, 2020 episode of The Tonight Show Starring Jimmy Fallon, Fallon along with the Backstreet Boys as the "Ragtime Gals" sang the song in the style of a barbershop quartet.

Sisqo appeared as himself in the fifth-season finale of Legends of Tomorrow, titled "Swan Thong", where the song played in the background as the Legends fight various villains of history when a button was pressed on the Sisqo display. A fan of the series himself, the singer agreed to wear the same outfit from the music video, as well as dying his hair platinum.

References

1999 songs
2000 singles
Def Jam Recordings singles
Music videos directed by Director X
Music videos directed by Joseph Kahn
Number-one singles in New Zealand
Songs written by Bob Robinson (songwriter)
Songs written by Tim Kelley
Song recordings produced by Tim & Bob
Sisqó songs
Songs written by Desmond Child
Songs written by Draco Rosa
Songs written by Sisqó